Torjus Sleen (born 30 March 1997) is a Norwegian racing cyclist, who currently rides for UCI ProTeam . He competed in the men's team time trial event at the 2017 UCI Road World Championships.

Major results
2015
 National Junior Road Championships
2nd Time trial
3rd Road race
2018
 1st  Road race, National Under–23 Road Championships
 4th Road race, National Road Championships
 6th Overall Czech Cycling Tour
1st  Young rider classification
 10th Hafjell GP
2019
 1st  Young rider classification Okolo Slovenska
 4th Time trial, National Road Championships
 7th Piccolo Giro di Lombardia
 10th Road race, UCI Road World Under–23 Championships
2020 
 8th Hafjell GP
2021 
 7th Overall Oberösterreich Rundfahrt
 8th Overall Tour of Małopolska

References

External links

1997 births
Living people
Norwegian male cyclists
Sportspeople from Tønsberg